The Lee Canyon Ski and Snowboard Resort is located in Lee Canyon,  northwest of Las Vegas, Nevada, United States in the Humboldt-Toiyabe National Forest and Spring Mountains National Recreation Area. The base lodge is situated at the base of Lee Peak, to the north of Mount Charleston, the eighth-highest peak in Nevada. The resort can be reached via US 95 to Nevada State Route 156.

Ski-area information
The resort is owned and operated by Powdr Corporation in partnership with the United States Forest Service under a special-use permit.

The area's total of  offers 11 alpine skiing and snowboarding trails.

History

People have been using the north-facing slopes of the area for winter recreation since the early 1930s. In the 1940s, the Las Vegas Ski Club operated a short rope tow and a warming hut.

Lee Canyon Ski Area was created in 1964, when the Forest Service issued a Special Use Permit in order to provide winter recreation options in Southern Nevada. In 1968 the first chairlift was installed. The main lodge building was completed in February, 1970.

Lee Canyon Ski Area officially became Las Vegas Ski and Snowboard Resort in 1995.

On October 7, 2009, Lee Canyon was the second resort in the United States to open for the 2009-2010 season. It was the longest season on record at Lee Canyon, at over 180 days.

References

External links 
Official website

Spring Mountains
Tourist attractions in the Las Vegas Valley
Buildings and structures in Clark County, Nevada
Ski areas and resorts in Nevada